Tirumala petiverana, the blue monarch, African blue tiger, or dappled monarch, is a butterfly of the family Nymphalidae. It is widespread in tropical and subtropical Sub-Saharan Africa. The habitat consists of Afromontane, lowland and riverine forests as well as  moist savanna.

The wingspan is 60–75 mm. There is one generation per year. Adults are on wing from February to May (with peaks in April) in Zimbabwe.

The larvae feed on Pergularia extensa, Pergularia daemia, Daemia, Hoya, and Marsdenia rubicunda.

References

Seitz, A. Die Gross-Schmetterlinge der Erde 13: Die Afrikanischen Tagfalter. Plate XIII 25

Tirumala (butterfly)
Butterflies of Africa
Butterflies described in 1847
Taxa named by Edward Doubleday